Loredo is a surname. Notable people with the surname include:

 Álvaro Elías Loredo (born 1947), Mexican politician
 Carlos Loredo (1951–1998), Cuban footballer
 John Loredo (born 1967), American politician
 Linda Loredo (1907–1931), actress and dancer
 Rafael Loredo (born 1957), Mexican football coach and former player

See also
 Laredo (disambiguation)
 Loreto (disambiguation)

Spanish-language surnames